Dadar Kirti is a 1980 Bengali romantic drama film directed by Tarun Majumdar. The film was based on an unpublished novel of the same name by Saradindu Bandopadhyay. It stars Tapas Paul, Mahua Roychoudhury, Ayan Banerjee, Debashree Roy, Sandhya Roy, Kali Banerjee, Ruma Guha Thakurta and Anup Kumar. Tapas Paul made his debut with this film. 

The film attained a huge box office success upon its release and still has a popular following.

Plot 
Kedar Chatujye (Tapas Paul), a dim-witted simpleton, is exiled to his uncle’s house in a small town in Bihar by his father, who is extremely angry with him for being unable to pass his B.A. exams after three attempts. The simple-minded Kedar becomes the butt of all jokes of his cousin Santu's (Ayan Banerjee) gang of friends led by Bhombol Bhattacharjee also known as  Bhombolda (Anup Kumar).

He falls in love of Saraswati (Mahua Roychoudhury), a girl with a strong, no-nonsense character who is the elder sister of Santu’s betrothed Beena (Debashree Roy), at first sight. Saraswati even falls in love of Kedar not because of Bhombal's many lies but because of his simple nature. Saraswati’s parents too are impressed by Kedar’s decency and simplicity; they soften up to Kedar. However, Bhombolda and his gang create misunderstandings between the two. A disappointed Saraswati decides to marry a rich boy from Bhagalpur (Kaushik Banerjee). At the end, Bhombolda realises that Kedar has a heart of gold and admits his wrongdoing leading Saraswati to marry Kedar.

Cast

Tapas Paul as Kedar a.k.a. Phulda
 Mahua Roychoudhury as Saraswati
Debashree Roy as Beena
 Ayan Banerjee as Santu
Anup Kumar as Bhombolda (Head of Chandobani club)
Satya Bandyopadhyay as Santu's father
Kali Banerjee as Saraswati and Beena's father
Sandhya Roy as Santu's boudi
Ruma Guha Thakurta as Saraswati and Beena's mother
Sulata Chowdhury as Phulmatia (Maid at Saraswati's house)
Haradhan Banerjee as Kedar's father (guest)
Kaushik Banerjee as Amarnath (rich boy from Bhagalpur) (guest)
Shamit Bhanja as Santu's elder brother (guest)
Monu Mukherjee as doctor (guest) 
Nimu Bhowmik
Shakti Thakur as Santu's friend (Stammer boy of the Chandobani club)

Crew
Direction: Tarun Majumdar
Production: Ram Cine Arts
Producer: Ram Gupta 
Production Controller: Ishwar Lal Sharma
Production Controller Assistants: Savitri Das
Story: Sharadindu Bandyopadhyay
Screenplay: Tarun Majumdar
Cinematography: Shakti Bannerjee
Music: Hemanta Mukherjee
Editing: Ramesh Joshi, Shaktipada Roy
Art Direction: Suresh Chandra Chandra
Audiography: Anil Dasgupta, Jyoti Chatterjee, Somesh Chatterjee, Amulya Das

Music
The music director of the film is Hemanta Mukherjee. The film has many uses of Rabindra Sangeet such as Charana Dharite, Ei korechho bhalo and also Bodhu Kon Alo Laaglo Chokhe, Guru Guru Guru Guru Ghono Megho which was the part of the play 'Chitrangada' in the movie. There was also a song which was originally written by Saradindu Bandopadhyay himself titled as Janam Abdhi. The music of the film was a huge hit upon release and is still popular today.

Source:

References

External links

www.upperstall.com preview

1980 films
Bengali-language Indian films
Films directed by Tarun Majumdar
Films scored by Hemant Kumar
1980s Bengali-language films
Indian romantic comedy films
Films based on works by Saradindu Bandopadhyay